PrepaTec is a group of high schools located through Mexico, which branch off from the Tec de Monterrey system. The first high school, Campus Eugenio Garza Sada, was launched in 1975 as a preparation for the university program. Eugenio Garza Sada died shortly before the first school began operations and the campus was named after him. Students are offered between three study plans: Bilingual, which is directed towards students that still need to improve their English skills, and take that subject as an intensive course, with the remaining subjects in Spanish, Multicultural, in which classes are offered in English and students can take up a third language if they prove their English skills are sufficient through a TOEFL test, or the IB Diploma, which is an educational program developed by the International Baccalaureate Organization recognized around the globe.

Facilities 

The following campuses are located in Monterrey :

Eugenio Garza Sada
Campus Eugenio Garza Sada is one of the first campuses of the Tecnológico de Monterrey, it began operations in August 1975. It is the oldest of the five PrepaTec campuses in Monterrey. It is located about 4 miles west of the city center within the colonia (neighborhood) of Del Carmen, between the districts of Valle and San Jerónimo, in the bank of the Santa Catarina river. The current principal of this campus is Erika Calles Barrón. This school was accredited an International Baccalaureate school in 1991.

This campus has:

 44 classrooms for 35 students each, all of them equipped to use the most modern technology.  
 Computer and Learning Space classrooms.
 Evaluation Center
 Collaborate-style classrooms with connections to the campus web.
 Library
 Cafeteria
 Cyber Cafe
 Cultural Hall
 Auditorium
 Gymnasium with exercise equipment
 Basketball and volleyball courts
 Handball and tennis courts
 Soccer field
 Softball field
 FIRST Team Botbusters’ 4635 Robotics Workshop, led by Head Coach Francisco Guerra

Eugenio Garza Lagüera
Campus Eugenio Garza Lagüera is located in the southern part of Monterrey City, 10 minutes away from Campus Monterrey. Initially named Preparatoria Eugenio Garza Sada Sur from its foundation until 1989 and later known as Preparatoria Eugenio Garza Lagüera, the school was renamed Campus Eugenio Garza Lagüera in 2001. The current principal of this campus is Alfredo Peña Marín.  This school was accredited an IB World School in 2005.
This campus has:

 57 classrooms for 35 students each, equipped to use the most modern technology.
 Library
 Auditorium
 Cafeteria
 5 Computer Classrooms
 Evaluation Center
 Cultural Hall
 Gymnasium with basketball and volleyball courts
 Gymnasium with exercise equipment
 Aerobics Room
 Jazz & Hip-Hop Room
 Football and Soccer Field
 Softball Field
 Track and Field installations
 Cyber Cafe
 3 Parking lots
 Innovaction Gym

Santa Catarina
Campus Santa Catarina was inaugurated in 1996, mainly to cover the San Pedro Garza García area. It is located in the district of Santa Catarina, N.L. The current principal of this campus is Crisantos Martínez. This school was accredited an IB World School in 2005.

Cumbres
In August 2001 Campus Cumbres began its operations; it is located in the western part of Monterrey. The current principal of this campus is Oscar Flores Cano. This school was accredited an IB World School in 2005.

This campus has:
 23 classrooms for 35 students each, equipped to use the most modern technology
 Library
 Evaluation Center
 Computer and Learning Space classrooms
 Cultural Hall
 Gymnasium with exercise equipment
 Aerobics room
 Cafeteria
 Soccer and Football Field
 4 multi-purpose courts for basketball, volleyball and indoor soccer
 Outdoor terraces in each floor of the building
 Recreational Patios

Valle Alto
In August 2005 Campus Valle Alto began its operations; it is located in the southern part of Monterrey, serving mainly the Valle Alto and part of San Pedro Garza García communities. The current principal of this campus is Engineer Manuel Gómez Candiani. This school was accredited an IB World School in 2006.

This campus has:
 25 classrooms for 32 students each, equipped to use the most modern technology
 Library
 Cafeteria
 2 Computer classrooms
 Gymnasium with exercise equipment
 2 outdoor basketball courts, which can double as volleyball and tennis courts
 Soccer field
 Evacuation Center
 2 Parking lots, one atop and one bellow.
 Cultural Hall

External links
 PrepaTec Official Web Page

Private schools in Mexico
Monterrey Institute of Technology and Higher Education
International Baccalaureate schools in Mexico